Gustaaf "Guus" Bierings (born 28 September 1956) is a retired Dutch cyclist who was active between 1975 and 1981. He was part of the Dutch teams that won the 1978 UCI Road World Championships and finished in 15th place at the 1980 Summer Olympics in the team time trial. He also won one stage of the Olympia's Tour in 1977.

See also
 List of Dutch Olympic cyclists

References

1956 births
Living people
Olympic cyclists of the Netherlands
Cyclists at the 1980 Summer Olympics
Dutch male cyclists
People from Uden
UCI Road World Champions (elite men)
UCI Road World Championships cyclists for the Netherlands
Cyclists from North Brabant